Fourche Maline (pronounced foosh-ma-lean) (Bad Fork, French) is a  tributary of the Poteau River in Oklahoma. The headwaters of Fourche Maline are in the Sans Bois Mountains in northwest Latimer County. It flows southwestward through Robbers Cave State Park, then southeastward past Wilburton before turning eastward until it reaches the Poteau River in Le Flore County. The distance from origin to confluence is about   Oklahoma Historian Muriel Wright translated the French name as meaning "treacherous fork" in English. During the days of the Indian Territory, Fourche Maline served as the boundary between Skullyville County and Sugar Loaf County, two of the constituent counties making up the Moshulatubbee District of the Choctaw Nation.

Fishing
Fourche Maline is habitat for the following species of fish:walleye, bream, bluegill, catfish, smallmouth bass, carp and rainbow trout.

A  section of Fourche Maline downstream of Carlton Lake Dam to the South Boundary of Robbers Cave Park is listed as a good area for rainbow trout by the blog Troutster. The same blog warns that trout generally fare poorly in Oklahoma summers. The state restocks trout every winter, starting November 1. At the Fourche Maline, the stocking season ends March 15.

Notes

References

External links
Headwaters of Fourche Maline-Map from TopoQuest (accessed June 29, 2008).
Mouth of Fourche Maline-Map from TopoQuest (accessed June 29, 2008).

Bodies of water of Latimer County, Oklahoma
Rivers of Oklahoma
Tributaries of the Arkansas River